Cortodera pseudomophlus is a species of beetle in the Lepturinae subfamily, that can be found in Armenia, North Iran and Talysh.

Description and habitat
Males are black, while females are reddish-black. Adults are on wing in June.

References

Lepturinae
Beetles described in 1889
Beetles of Asia